Pogonoperca is a genus of marine ray-finned fish, related to the groupers and classified within the subfamily Epinephelinae of the family Serranidae. They are found in the Indo-Pacific region.

Etymology
The genus name Pogonoperca derives from the Greek ( meaning beard and  meaning perch).

Species
Species within this genus include:

 Pogonoperca ocellata Günther, 1859 (Indian soapfish)
 Pogonoperca punctata (Valenciennes, 1830) (Spotted soapfish)

References

Grammistini
Ray-finned fish genera
Taxa named by Albert Günther